Stefan Casteleyn (born February 25, 1974 in Brussels) is a professional squash player who represented Belgium. He reached a career-high world ranking of World No. 7 in December 1999.

He married fellow Belgian squash player, Kim Hannes in 2014.

References

External links 

Belgian male squash players
Living people
1974 births
Sportspeople from Brussels